Michael Scott Kingery (born March 29, 1961), is a former professional baseball player who played in the Major Leagues, primarily as an outfielder, from 1986–1992 and 1994–1996. Kingery's career high for home runs in a season was 9, set in 1987 while playing limited time with the Seattle Mariners. Kingery finished his career with the Pittsburgh Pirates in 1996. He currently lives in Willmar, Minnesota.

External links

 Solid Foundation Baseball School, Inc.
 The Kingery Family Singers

1961 births
Living people
People from St. James, Minnesota
Kansas City Royals players
Seattle Mariners players
San Francisco Giants players
Oakland Athletics players
Colorado Rockies players
Pittsburgh Pirates players
Major League Baseball center fielders
Major League Baseball right fielders
Baseball players from Minnesota
American expatriate baseball players in Canada
Calgary Cannons players
Charleston Royals players
Fort Myers Royals players
Memphis Chicks players
Omaha Royals players
Phoenix Firebirds players
Tacoma Tigers players